Jack Elementary School was a public elementary school located in the Munjoy Hill neighborhood of Portland, Maine. Jack Elementary was Portland's largest school until the time of its closure. The school made headlines when 100% of the teachers, administrators and other employees of the school reported symptoms related to mold poisoning from Stachybotrys chartarum. The mold can cause symptoms that are flu-like down up to pulmonary hemorrhage.

The school was closed in 2001 and then later torn down as a result of the mold contamination. Students from the school were reassigned to three other schools within the city. A new school on, named East End Community School was opened in 2006.

In its prime, the school was an impressive building.  There were huge hallways with massive solid wood doors opening into large-size classrooms with high ceilings.  The playground behind the school was built in the late 1980s by a cooperative effort involving contractors, school faculty and students, as well as members of the community who brought their own tools and donated their time.  The new playground was said to be the largest and most modern playground in the city school system when it was finished.

This school was originally built and known as Jack Junior High School for grade 7 and 8 students from the Munjoy Hill neighborhood, fed from Emerson School on Emerson St. and North School on Congress St (both now converted to housing).

References 
 Quimby, Beth.  Colorful construction of Portland's new school on schedule, Portland Press Herald.  August 30, 2005.

Defunct schools in Portland, Maine
Educational institutions disestablished in 2001
Munjoy Hill
Demolished buildings and structures in Maine